Coed Darcy is a new village currently being developed adjacent to Llandarcy in Neath Port Talbot county borough, Wales.

Historical background
The village is being built on brownfield land vacated by a former oil refinery, the Llandarcy Oil Refinery, owned by BP.  The oil refinery was the first crude oil refinery in the UK, and was constructed between 1918 and 1922.  The refinery produced diesel, kerosene and other products.  During the post-war period, the refinery underwent large scale development as demand for products increased to 340,000 tonnes per year.  Due to economic changes, it was announced in 1997 that the site would close.

Planned outputs
The £1.2 billion planned community development will comprise 4,000 homes, community facilities, employment space and open space covering .  Four new schools (1 Welsh primary, 2 English primaries and 1 secondary) are planned.  Part of the development proposals includes a new southern access road linking the village to the Fabian Way (A483) into Swansea.

The construction work is expected to create 3,000 to 4,000 jobs which includes jobs created directly in the construction industry and from related support services.  The village is expected to become a home to some 10,000 people once development is complete.

Planning and construction
The design specification was developed with input from The Prince's Foundation and the village will be developed as an urban village in a similar fashion the Poundbury development, which is hoped will encourage people live and work in the same community.  The development is expected to take 20 years to complete.

The name of the village was suggested by members of Coedffranc Community Council.  The village takes its name from the local parish of Coedffranc and the neighbouring village of Llandarcy.

On 8 May 2007, it was announced that St. Modwen Properties was appointed as the preferred developer of the site.  St. Modwen will lead the redevelopment and reclamation of the brownfield site, which is planned to take seven years.  The remediation work involves removing contaminated material from the land which was deposited when the site was used as a refinery.  The reclamation work involves removing the remaining unrequired oil refinery infrastructure such as pipeworks, buildings and roads, including the draining of a large reservoir at the northern part of the site.  The full completion of the regeneration project is anticipated by 2026–8.

Area one
The first properties, designed by Robert Adam, Director at ADAM Architecture were developed by Edward Ware Homes and Atlantic Properties Plc (Atlantic Ware Developments) with construction being carried out by Dawnus. Area One is marketed as Heritage Gate.

Main site
Construction work on the main site began in November 2012 where 302 houses will be built on what will be the first of three residential neighborhoods on the site.

Controversies
The development of the village has not been devoid of controversy.  The residents' association of the neighbouring village of Llandarcy are concerned that the new development does not swallow up Llandarcy.  Concerns were expressed about some green belt land being used up in addition to the brownfield site by the village and the new access road to the Fabian Way.  The Countryside Council for Wales is monitoring the development of the village.

References

External links
WalesOnline.com - Coed Darcy work to begin
Evening post - Village's '4,000 new jobs bonanza'
ADAM Architecture website

Villages in Neath Port Talbot
Populated places established in 2008
New Urbanism communities
Buildings and structures under construction in the United Kingdom
BP
New Classical architecture